The trapezium bone (greater multangular bone) is a carpal bone in the hand. It forms the radial border of the carpal tunnel.

Structure
The trapezium is distinguished by a deep groove on its anterior surface. It is situated at the radial side of the carpus, between the scaphoid and the first metacarpal bone (the metacarpal bone of the thumb). It is homologous with the first distal carpal of reptiles and amphibians.

Surfaces
The trapezium is an irregular-shaped carpal bone found within the hand. The trapezium is found within the distal row of carpal bones, and is directly adjacent to the metacarpal bone of the thumb. On its ulnar surface are found the trapezoid and scaphoid bones.

The superior surface is directed upward and medialward; medially it is smooth, and articulates with the scaphoid; laterally it is rough and continuous with the lateral surface.

The inferior surface is oval, concave from side to side, convex from before backward, so as to form a saddle-shaped surface for articulation with the base of the first metacarpal bone. This saddle-shaped articulation is partially responsible for the thumb's opposable motion.

The dorsal surface is smooth.

The palmar surface is narrow and rough. At its upper part is a deep groove, running from above obliquely downward and medialward; it transmits the tendon of the Flexor carpi radialis, and is bounded laterally by an oblique ridge. This surface gives origin to the Opponens pollicis and to the Abductor and Flexor pollicis brevis; it also affords attachment to the transverse carpal ligament.

The lateral surface is broad and rough, for the attachment of ligaments.

The medial surface presents two facets; the upper, large and concave, articulates with the trapezoid bone; the lower, small and oval, with the base of the second metacarpal.

Tubercle of trapezium
The tubercle of trapezium is a tubercle found on the anterior surface of the bone. It is where sometimes abductor pollicis brevis muscle attaches.

Function
The carpal bones function as a unit to provide a bony superstructure for the hand. The trapezium is the most radial of the bones surrounding the carpal tunnel. It is important in thumb movement.

Clinical relevance
The trapezium is susceptible to arthritis at the joint with the metacarpal bone of the thumb, due to overuse.

History
The etymology derives from the Greek trapezion which means "a little table", from trapeza meaning "table", itself from (te)tra- "four" and pod- "foot". The bone was first documented in 1840.

Additional images

See also

 Carpal bone
Finger
Hand

References

Skeletal system
Wrist
Bones of the hand
Carpal bones